Silla Arts and Science Museum is a private history and science museum located in the district of Gyeongju Folk Craft Village, Ha-dong, Gyeongju, North Gyeongsang, South Korea. It was established on 15, October, 1988 by Seok U-il (昔宇一) to provide an opportunity that children and youths visiting Gyeongju could know the root of Korean science. The museum in housed in a two-story building with a basement and consists of six exhibition halls according to theme. The first exhibition room located on the first floor presents a total of seven subjects while the second exhibition room located on the basement displays models of Seokguram grotto, one of representative tangible cultural properties of Gyeongju. The third exhibition room on the west part of the second floor exhibits a model of the bronze bell at Sangwonsa temple in the real size and presents information of bell-making process.

Gallery

See also
Gyeongju National Museum
List of museums in South Korea

References

External links
 The official site
 Silla Art and Science Museum

Museums in Gyeongju
Science museums in South Korea
History museums in South Korea
Museums established in 1988